Gao Di (born 6 January 1990) is a Chinese professional footballer who currently plays as a forward for Chinese Super League side Zhejiang.

Club career
Gao Di started his football career with Shandong Luneng's youth academy in 1999 and was promoted to the first team during the 2008 league season. Despite not making a league appearance for Shandong, he was still given a league title medal because he was included in the team's eighteen-man squad. He would go on to make his debut on 20 May 2009 starting against Sriwijaya F.C. in an AFC Champions League game that saw Shandong lose 4-2 despite Gao scoring his debut goal. Gao would go on to make his league debut on 9 April 2010 against Chongqing Lifan in a 3-0 win, coming on as a late substitute.

In February 2013, Gao was loaned out to Hangzhou Greentown for the entire 2013 league season to gain more playing time. He scored his first goal for the club on his debut on 10 March 2013 against Changchun Yatai in a 1-1 draw.

On 24 February 2014, Gao transferred to fellow Chinese Super League side Shanghai Shenhua. He made his debut for the club in a 2-0 win against Shanghai Shenxin on 9 March 2014, scoring his first two goals for the club.
On 28 February 2017, Gao was loaned to fellow Super League side Jiangsu Suning until 31 December 2017.

After many years in the top tier of Chinese football, Gao Di joined China League One club Changchun Yatai on loan ahead of the 2020 season. He scored his first goal for the club in his debut against Heilongjiang Lava Spring on 12th September 2020. Throughout the campaign he assisted the club in winning the division title and promotion to the top tier. Gao would remain within the division with another season long loan with Zhejiang whom he joined on 3 March 2021. Making his debut in a league game on 24 April 2021 against Zibo Cuju in a 4-0 victory. He would then play a vital part as the club gained promotion to the top tier at the end of the 2021 campaign.

International career
Gao made his debut for the Chinese national team on 18 June 2014 in a 2-0 win against Macedonia, coming on as a substitute to score his first international goal.

Career statistics

Club
Statistics accurate as of match played 31 January 2023.

International goals

Scores and results list China's goal tally first.

Honours

Club
Shandong Luneng
Chinese Super League: 2008, 2010

Shanghai Shenhua
Chinese FA Cup: 2019

Changchun Yatai
 China League One: 2020

References

External links
 
 
Player profile at Shandong Luneng website 
Player stats at sohu.com 

1990 births
Living people
People from Jining
Chinese footballers
Footballers from Shandong
Shandong Taishan F.C. players
Zhejiang Professional F.C. players
Shanghai Shenhua F.C. players
Jiangsu F.C. players
Changchun Yatai F.C. players
China international footballers
Chinese Super League players
China League One players
Association football forwards